The Baduspanids or Badusbanids, were a local Iranian dynasty of Tabaristan which ruled over Ruyan/Rustamdar. The dynasty was established in 665, and with 933 years of rule as the longest dynasty in Iran, it ended in 1598 when the Safavids invaded and conquered their domains.

History 
During the Arab invasion of Iran, the last Sasanian King of Kings Yazdegerd III reportedly granted control over Tabaristan to the Dabuyid ruler Gil Gavbara, who was a great-grandson of  Jamasp. Gil Gavbara's son Baduspan I was granted control over Ruyan in 665, thus forming the Baduspanid dynasty, which would rule the region until the 1590s. Another son, Dabuya succeeded their father the former as the head of the Dabuyid family, ruling the rest of Tabaristan. 

The last Dabuyid ruler Khurshid managed to safeguard his realm against the Umayyad Caliphate, but after its replacement by the Abbasid Caliphate, he was finally defeated in 760. Tabaristan was subsequently made a regular province of the caliphate, ruled from Amul by an Arab governor, although the local dynasties of the Bavandids, Qarinvandids, the Zarmihrids and Baduspanids, formerly subject to the Dabuyids, continued to control the mountainous interior as tributary vassals of the Abbasid government. These rulers were largely if not completely autonomous. Due to the regional prominence of the Baduspanids, Ruyan became known as Rustamdar in the Mongol era, a deformed form of their regnal title, ustandar, which they had used since the rule of Shahriyar III ibn Jamshid.

The Baduspanids were briefly deposed from power by the Mar'ashis, who ruled Rustamdar from 1381 till 1390, when they decided to install Baduspanid prince Sa'd al-Dawla Tus on the throne in Rustamdar to challenge the Afrasiyabid prince Iskandar-i Shaykhi who accompanied the Turco-Mongol ruler Timur, who intended to conquer Mazandaran. However, Tus secretly corresponded with Iskandar-i Shaykhi, and eventually joined the forces of Timur in 1392. The following year (1393), Timur dislodged the Mar'ashis and conquered Mazandaran. In 1399/1400, he deprived the Baduspanids of most of their holdings by sending his troops to administer most of Rustamdar. The holdings of the new Baduspanid ruler Kayumarth I were now restricted to that of the castle of Nur. However, in 1405, he restored his rule in Rustamdar. He died in 1453. After his death, a dynastic struggle followed, which resulted in his kingdom being split up by his sons Iskandar IV and Ka'us II, in Kojur and Nur respectively. The Baduspanid dynasty was never to be united again, with the two branches ruling separately until they were eventually deposed in 1590s by the Safavid monarch of Iran, Abbas the Great.

Known Baduspanid rulers 
 665-694 : Baduspan I
 694-723 : Khurzad ibn Baduspan
 723-762 : Baduspan II
 762-791 : Shahriyar I ibn Baduspan
 791-822 : Vanda-Umid
 822-855 : Abdallah ibn Vanda-Umid

Afridunid line 
 855-??? : Afridun ibn Karan
 ???-??? : Baduspan III
 ???-??? : Shahriyar II ibn Baduspan
 887-899 : Hazar Sandan

Shahriyarid line 
 899-938 : Shahriyar III ibn Jamshid
 938-965 : Muhammad
 965-??? : Istwandad
 974-1010 : Zarrin-Kamar I
 1010-1036 : Ba-Harb
 1036-1067 : Fakhr al-Dawla Namavar I
 1067-1092 : Ardashir
 1092-1132: Hazarasp I
 1117-1168 : Shahrivash
 1168-1184 : Kai Ka'us I
 1184-1190 : Hazarasp II
 1190-1209 : Bavandid occupation
 1209-1213 : Zarrin-Kamar II
 1213 -1223 :  Bisutun I
 1223-1242/1243 : Fakhr al-Dawla Namavar II
 Died in 1242 : Hosam al-Dawla Ardashir
 1242- ???? : Iskandar I
 1242-1272 : Shahragim
 1272-1301 : Namawar Shah Ghazi
 1301-1311 : Kay Khusraw
 1311-1317 : Shams al-Muluk Muhammad
 1317-1324 : Nasir al-Din Shahriyar
 1324-1333 : Taj al-Dawla Ziyar
 1333-1359 : Jalal al-Dawla Iskandar
 1359-1378 : Fakhr al-Dawla Shah-Ghazi
 1378-1379 : Adud al-Dawla Qubad
 1379-1391 : Mar'ashi occupation
 1391-1394 : Sa'd al-Dawla Tus
 1399-1453 : Kayumarth I

Nur branch 
 1453-1467 : Ka'us II
 1467-1499 : Jahangir I
 1499-1507 : Bisutun II
 1507-1550 : Bahman of Tabaristan
 1550-1576 : Kayumarth IV
 1582-1586 : Sultan Aziz
 1586-1593/1594 : Jahangir III

Kojur branch 
 1453-1476 : Iskandar IV
 1476-1491 : Taj-al-Dawla ibn Iskandar
 1491-1507 : Ashraf ibn Taj al-Dawla
 1507-1543 : Ka'us III
 1543-1555 : Kayumarth III
 1555-1567 : Jahangir II
 1568-1590 : Sultan Mohammad ibn Jahangir
 1590-1598 : Jahangir IV

See also 
 Dabuyid dynasty
 Bavand dynasty
 House of Ispahbudhan

References

Sources